Lee Nishanian (born December 28, 1991) is an American soccer player. He graduated from Los Osos High School in Rancho Cucamonga, CA in 2010.

Career
Nishanian spent all four years of his collegiate career at California State University, San Bernardino and also spent the 2013 season with USL Premier Development League club Thunder Bay Chill.  On March 21, 2014, it was announced that Nishanian signed a one-year deal with USL Pro club LA Galaxy II.  He made his professional debut on April 24 in a 1-1 draw with Arizona United SC.

Nishanian signed a 1-year deal with USL side Harrisburg City Islanders on February 23, 2017.

References

External links
Cal State San Bernardino Coyotes bio
USSF Development Academy bio

1991 births
Living people
American soccer players
American expatriate soccer players
Thunder Bay Chill players
LA Galaxy II players
Penn FC players
Association football defenders
Soccer players from California
Expatriate soccer players in Canada
USL League Two players
USL Championship players